The Bei'an–Mohe Expressway, designated as G1213 and commonly abbreviated as Yancheng Expressway is an expressway in Heilongjiang, Northeast China linking the cities of Bei'an and Mohe, Heilongjiang. The highway is a branch of G12 Hunchun–Ulanhot Expressway.

Detailed Itinerary

References

Expressways in Heilongjiang
Chinese national-level expressways